VFD Microfinance Bank is a fully digital bank with headquarters in Lagos, Nigeria. As a digital bank it offers free banking services to Nigerians. The bank is headed by Gbenga Omolokun as the managing director. VFD Microfinance Bank is a subsidiary of VFD Group a proprietary investment company with Nonso Okpala as Managing Director/ CEO

Vbank 
VBank (V by VFD or V) is a virtual bank and platform powered by VFD Microfinance Bank and was launched on March 25, 2020. It was created to offer free online banking. Currently, VBank has onboarded more than 500,000 active individuals and businesses on its mobile banking platform across Nigeria.

Veelage 
Veelage is VBank’s community-based reward system that allows customers earn on the go. Veelagers are ranked and rewarded based on their active participation.

VBiz 
VBiz is the VBank equivalent for businesses. It is an all-in-one platform enabling Corporate and SME (Small and Medium Enterprises) users to open, manage and transact from their V Bank Accounts.

Awards 
VBank has won the following awards:

Gage Banking App of The Year, 2021. 
Gage Mobile Banking App of The Year, 2022.

References

Online banks
Banks of Africa
Banks of Nigeria
Companies based in Lagos